The 2019 MTV Video Music Awards Japan were held on September 18, 2019.

Abstract 
"Best Video of the Year" is determined by public voting. It's announced with two special awards (BALLISTIK BOYZ and Foorin) at the ceremony. King Gnu won the Best Video of the year, it's only 8 months from their major debut, it's the fastest in the history of MTV VMAJ. While Foorin is the youngest artist of the winners at the ceremony.

Main Awards

Best Video of the Year
King Gnu – "Hakujitsu"

Best Male Video
Japan
Daichi Miura — "Katasumi" (片隅, corner)
| International
Khalid — "Talk"

Best Female Video
Japan
Aimyon — "Kon'ya kono mama" (今夜このまま, Let the Night)
| International
Taylor Swift — "Me!"

Best Group Video
Japan
Keyakizaka46 — "Kuroi Hitsuji" (黒い羊, Black Sheep)
| International
The 1975  — "Sincerity Is Scary"

Best New Artist Video
Japan
King Gnu – "Hakujitsu" (白日, White Day)
| International
Billie Eilish – "Bad Guy"

Best Rock Video
Bump of Chicken – "Aurora"

Best Alternative Video
BiSH – "Stereo future"

Best Pop Video
Masaki Suda – "Machigai sagashi" (まちがいさがし, Looking for mistakes)

Best Hip Hop Video
KREVA – "Neiro~2019 Ver.~" (音色 ～2019 Ver.～, Tone~2019 Ver.~)

Best Dance Video
Sakanaction – "Wasurerarenai no" (忘れられないの, I can't forget)

Best Collaboration Video
Ringo Sheena and Hiroji Miyamoto – "Kemono yuku hosomichi" (獣ゆく細道, The Narrow Way)

Best Choreography
Hinatazaka46 – "Kyun" (キュン)

Special awards

MTV Rock the World Award
Glay

Artist of the Year
One Ok Rock

Song of the Year
Official Hige Dandism - Pretender

Best Album of the Year
Gen Hoshino - Pop Virus

Best Buzz Award
BTS

Rising Star Award
The Boyz

Ballistik Boyz from Exile Tribe

MTV Breakthrough Song 
Foorin - Paprika

References

2019 in Japanese music
2019 music awards